The Frances A. Genter Stakes is an American Thoroughbred horse race run annually at the end of December at Calder Race Course in Miami Gardens, Florida. Contested on turf over a distance of  furlongs, the Grade III event is open to three-year-old fillies.

Inaugurated in 1993 as the Frances A. Genter Handicap in honor of longtime Thoroughbred owner Frances A. Genter—whose best-known horse was Florida-bred Unbridled, the winner of the 1990 Florida Derby who went on to win that year's Kentucky Derby and Breeders' Cup Classic.

The Frances A. Genter Stakes was contested at a distance of one mile in 1994 and was run in two divisions in 2000.

Due to financial pressure, Calder has announced the cancellation of this race for 2008 and possibly longer.

Records
Speed  record:
 1:27.07 – Laurafina (2005)

Most wins by an owner:
 No owner has won this race more than once.

Most wins by a jockey:
 3 – René Douglas (1993, 2000, 2007)
 3 – Abdiel Toribio (1994, 1995, 1997)

Most wins by a trainer:
 3 – Christophe Clement (1999, 2000, 2007)

Winners of the Frances A. Genter Stakes

References
 The Frances A. Genter Stakes at Pedigree Query

Graded stakes races in the United States
Horse races in Florida
Turf races in the United States
Flat horse races for three-year-old fillies
Sprint category horse races for fillies and mares
Recurring sporting events established in 1993
Calder Race Course
1993 establishments in Florida